The Lord President Reid Chair of Law is a named academic position at the Edinburgh Law School, established in 1972 with W. A. Wilson as the inaugural holder. The following persons have held the office:
 Professor W. A. Wilson (1972–94).
 Professor George Gretton (1994–2016).
 Professor Alexandra Braun (2017- ).

References 

Academics of the University of Edinburgh
Edinburgh-related lists
Professorships at the University of Edinburgh
Professorships in law